Opharus franclemonti is a moth of the family Erebidae. It was described by Watson and Goodger in 1986. It is found in Peru.

References

Opharus
Moths described in 1986
Moths of South America